Not in the Flesh is 2007 novel by British crime-writer Ruth Rendell.  The novel is the 21st entry in the Inspector Wexford series.

References

2007 British novels
Novels by Ruth Rendell
Hutchinson (publisher) books
Inspector Wexford series